Stewart MacDonald is a Scottish Labour Party local government councillor. He was elected to the East Kirkintilloch and Twechar Ward of East Dunbartonshire Council in the 2007 election. He is also a member of Kirkintilloch Community Council and the Bridgeton Burns Club, and was a director of the East Dunbartonshire Municipal Bank between 2007 and 2015 and the East Dunbartonshire Leisure and Culture Trust from 2010 to the present.

Early life
MacDonald was born in Glasgow in 1967 and educated at Lenzie Academy where he was an active member of the School Debating Society, the Pupils' Council, and also worked on the independently funded and published Pupils' Own magazine. He was awarded colours by the school for his work in inter-schools debating competitions. On leaving school, he worked in sales before attending Glasgow Polytechnic in 1989 where he gained an HND in Business Studies. While he was a student, he played drums in a number of rock bands including Hugh Reed and the Velvet Underpants.

On graduation, he joined Sainsbury's as a Management Trainee where he worked in Edinburgh, Sheffield, London and Chatham. He left to join John Menzies in 1993 during which time he ran the Alness store.

In 1995,  MacDonald joined Gillespie of Lenzie, becoming Motability Specialist after transferring to the Tomkins branch in Glasgow's East End in 1997. The company was taken over by the Arnold Clark organisation in 2006  As Motability Specialist, MacDonald looked after the needs of vehicle users with disabilities throughout their contracts.  This experience led to him becoming a volunteer with the Kirkintilloch Citizens' Advice Bureau from 2004 to 2006 and to study Democracy and Social Policy with the Open University where he gained a BSc. with Honours.

In July 2009, MacDonald left Arnold Clark to work at Airdrie Citizens' Advice Bureau.

Political life
During his time at Glasgow Polytechnic, MacDonald took part in a number of campaigns and demonstrations organised by the National Union of Students (NUS) against the poll tax and the abolition of Student Grants.

He became a member of Kirkintilloch Community Council in 2003 and stood as Labour's candidate for the Chapelton Ward of East Dunbartonshire Council in 2003 where he was defeated by the Liberal Democrat candidate, Fiona Callison.

He took part in the February 15, 2003 anti-war protest march against the invasion of Iraq organised by the Stop the War Coalition.

In 2005, MacDonald gave a speech on behalf of Cumbernauld, Kilsyth and Kirkintilloch East Constituency Labour Party to the Scottish Labour Party Conference on the minimum wage.

He is currently vice-chair of the Cumbernauld, Kilsyth and Kirkintilloch East Constituency Labour Party and is a member of the GMB Trade Union.

East Dunbartonshire Council
In the 2007 Local Government Election, MacDonald was returned as one of three councillors for East Kirkintilloch and Twechar Ward, where he also lives. He was re-elected in 2012 and 2017.

He sits on a number of committees with East Dunbartonshire Council including Housing and Community Services, where he is vice-convenor, and the Housing Appeals Panel where he is convenor. He also represents East Dunbartonshire Council on the Hillhead Housing Association and Antonine Housing Association's Management Committees.

References
2007 Local Government Election Results
Police Event
Bearsden and Milngavie Herald report on public planning meeting
East Dunbartonshire Council Website
Councillor MacDonald's website
East Dunbartonshire Municipal Bank entry at Companies House
East Dunbartonshire Leisure and Culture Trust entry at Companies House
Board of East Dunbartonshire Leisure and Culture Trust

1967 births
Living people
Scottish Labour councillors
Councillors in East Dunbartonshire
Alumni of the Open University
People educated at Lenzie Academy
Politicians from Kirkintilloch